Da Hit Squad is a professional wrestling tag team that formerly competed in Ring of Honor, Jersey All Pro Wrestling and many other independent promotions. The members are Monsta Mack and Mafia. They are known as the Hardest Hitting tag team on the indies. This duo of Repeat Offenders brutalized   their opponents with numerous high impact moves.

History
Da Hit Squad was a part of the first ever Ring of Honor match. They faced the Christopher Street Connection at The Era of Honor Begins, defeating them in minutes to prove that wrestling is greater than sports entertainment. The next few ROH shows saw Da Hit Squad winning many squash matches. Later, they began feuding with teams such as The Carnage Crew and the Natural Born Sinners. The Carnage Crew wanted to prove that they were really the hardest hitting team in ROH, so the two teams engaged in a series of hardcore matches. At Honor Invades Boston, Da Hit Squad defeated The Carnage Crew in a Boston Massacre Match, which featured chairs, hubcaps, and barbed wire boards. At the next show, before a match between Da Hit Squad and the Natural Born Sinners could take place, The Carnage Crew came to the ring and attacked the teams. This led to a Falls Count Anywhere match between The Carnage Crew and Da Hit Squad at ROH's biggest show to date, Glory By Honor. The match was won by The Carnage Crew after they hit the Carnage Driver from a stage through a table. The following months saw Da Hit Squad in a series of scramble matches. They also teamed up with Low Ki to defeat Special K.

Besides Ring of Honor, Da Hit Squad has had much success in other promotions, such as Jersey All Pro Wrestling. There, they won the JAPW Tag Team Championship five different times and competed against teams such as the Haas Brothers, the Shane Twins, and Insane Dragon and Dixie. Monsta Mack and Mafia also teamed together in other local companies, such as Long Island Wrestling and Jersey Championship Wrestling.

Da Hit Squad's last match together was at the Round Robin Challenge II against the Second City Saints. Dan Maff (Mafia) had already joined The Prophecy, and after the match, he attacked Monsta Mack, officially breaking up the team. Monsta Mack no longer competed in ROH after the team broke up, but Dan Maff continued wrestling and won the ROH Tag Team Championship two times with B. J. Whitmer.

They reunited on Saturday July 10 to take part in Acid Fest, a tribute show for Trent Acid, held at the ECW Arena.  Da Hit Squad were called out by the United States Death Machine who were at the time the JAPW Tag Team Champions.  On night one of the JAPW 13th Anniversary Show, they defeated the United States Death Machine for a record setting sixth time. They would lose the titles to Necro Butcher and Nick Gage the next day.

Maff and Mack recently reunited at CZW Proving Grounds in 2016 to confront current CZW Tag Team Champions TV Ready (BLK Jeez and Pepper Parks). On May 14 at Prelude To Violence they defeated TV Ready to win the CZW World Tag Team Championships.

Championships and accomplishments
Beyond Wrestling
Tournament For Tomorrow 4 Tag Team (2015)
Combat Zone Wrestling
CZW World Tag Team Championship (1 time)
Impact Championship Wrestling
ICW Tag Team Championship (1 time)
Jersey All Pro Wrestling
JAPW Tag Team Championship (6 times)
Jersey Championship Wrestling
JCW Tag Team Championship (1 time)
USA Pro Wrestling
USA Pro Tag Team Championship (2 times)
Other titles
NAWA Tag Team Championship (1 time)
NAWA United States Tag Team Championship (1 time)
UCW Tag Team Championship (1 time)

References

Independent promotions teams and stables
Ring of Honor teams and stables